Sporadic hemiplegic migraine (SHM) is a form of hemiplegic migraine headache isolated cases of which are observed. It is a rare disease. It is considered to be a separate type of migraine.

Presentation
Sporadic hemiplegic migraine (SHM) has clinical symptoms identical to familial hemiplegic migraine (FHM) and distinct from migraine with aura. By definition the neurodeficits are supposed to be reversible. However, some cases with permanent neurological deficits have also been noted.

Cause
CACNA1A, ATP1A2 and SCNA1 appear to be the genes that cause the condition of sporadic hemiplegic  migraine.

Diagnosis
Diagnostic criteria require motor symptoms and at least one visual, sensory, or speech symptom, resembling basilar migraine. They may also be associated with cerebellar signs.

Investigations
MRI features can be suggestive of cortical infarction and edema.

Differential diagnosis
Differential diagnoses can be:
 Todd's paresis
 Stroke
 Systemic lupus erythematosus
 Metabolic disorders
 Inherited disorders such as mitochondrial myopathy
 Functional neurological disorder

Treatment

Epidemiology
Prevalence is estimated to be 0.005%. The age of onset has been found to be under 15 years in 40% of cases while it is between 10 and 14 years in one third of the cases. Females outnumber males, 4 to 1. Only 3% have attacks after age 52.

References

External links 

Channelopathies
Headaches
Rare diseases